Endothelial differentiation-related factor 1 is a protein that in humans is encoded by the EDF1 gene.

Function 

This gene encodes a protein that may regulate endothelial cell differentiation. It has been postulated that the protein functions as a bridging molecule that interconnects regulatory proteins and the basal transcriptional machinery, thereby modulating the transcription of genes involved in endothelial differentiation. This protein has also been found to act as a transcriptional coactivator by interconnecting the general transcription factor TATA element-binding protein (TBP) and gene-specific activators. Two alternatively spliced transcripts which encode distinct proteins have been found for this gene.

Interactions 

EDF1 has been shown to interact with:
 Liver X receptor alpha,
 Peroxisome proliferator-activated receptor gamma,  and
 TATA binding protein.

References

Further reading